Eugène Muslar (born 28 March 1959) is a Belizean long-distance runner. He competed in the men's marathon at the 1988 Summer Olympics and the 1996 Summer Olympics.

References

1959 births
Living people
Athletes (track and field) at the 1984 Summer Olympics
Athletes (track and field) at the 1988 Summer Olympics
Athletes (track and field) at the 1996 Summer Olympics
Belizean male long-distance runners
Belizean male marathon runners
Olympic athletes of Belize
Place of birth missing (living people)